Ausgeflippt is Hanzel und Gretyl's debut full-length album, released on October 10, 1995, via Energy Rekords. Much like their second full-length album, Transmissions from Uranus, it is mostly techno-industrial, unlike later releases. The album featured mostly German and English lyrics, but also featured lyrics in Romanian ("Apa Mare"), Greek ("Galaxia Malakia") and French ("L'Experience des Difficultés Technique"). It received some good reviews upon its release, and even spawned a successful single in the form of "Shine 2001", which reached number one on the Alternative Press Dance Chart.

Track listing 
 "Star System Wolf 424" – 1:12
 "0 Gemini 31" – 4:02
 "Galaxia Malakia" – 4:25
 "Shine 2001" – 3:30
 "Stress Pill" – 3:02
 "Dementia Solaris" – 4:12
 "Meisterfrau" – 4:37
 "38 Lashes" – 4:51
 "L'Experience des Difficultés Technique" – 3:49
 "Watch TV Do Nothing" – 3:46
 "Essen Scheißen und Geld Machen" – 3:25
 "Apa Mare" – 2:47
 "Umbra Penumbra" – 11:23

Credits 
Kaizer von Loopy & Vas Kallas: vocals and Instrumentals, except on "Apa Mare"
Tilly Balamaci: vocals on "Apa Mare"
Produced by Hanzel und Gretyl at Kinderland Studios, New York City, except for "Essen Scheißen und Geld Machen", produced by Bryce Goggin
Mixed by Hanzel und Gretyl and Suz Dyer at RPM Studios, and Kinderland Studios, New York City
Mastered by Greg Calbi at Masterdisk

External links 
Hanzel und Gretyl's official website
Official MySpace page

Hanzel und Gretyl albums
1995 debut albums
Energy Records albums